Joseph Maull (September 6, 1781 – May 3, 1846) was an American physician and politician from Lewes, in Sussex County, Delaware. He was a veteran of the War of 1812, and a member of the Federalist Party, then later the Whig Party, who served in the Delaware General Assembly and as Governor of Delaware.

Early life and family
Maull was born at Pilottown, near Lewes, Delaware, son of John and Mary Marsh Maull. His father was a shipwright who ran arms from the West Indies during the American Revolution. He died, so the story goes, when a ship's mast fell on him. During the American Revolution, Joseph Maull had an uncle, Nathaniel, who piloted ships for the American Committee of Safety, and another, James, who scouted the Delaware Bay for the British. Maull, himself, served in the 3rd Brigade of Delaware Militia, defending Lewes during the War of 1812.

Maull studied medicine under Dr. John Wolfe of Lewes and spent the rest of his life as a practicing physician from his home in Milton, Delaware. He married Penelope Shields in 1802 and they had two children, Susan and George. After her death, he married Sarah Davis Watson in 1820, and they had no children. They were members of St. Peter's Episcopal Church in Lewes.

Political career
Maull served in the state senate for 21 years, from the 1816 session through the 1824 session, again from the 1827 session through the 1830 session and finally from the 1839/40 session through the 1845/46 session. As he was Speaker during the last session, he became Governor of Delaware upon the death of Governor Thomas Stockton on March 2, 1846, serving until his own death on May 3, 1846. He was the seventh Governor of Delaware to die in office. Maull began his career as a Federalist, and joined the Whig Party with the party realignment of the 1830s. When he was governor he was opposed to the foreign policy of U.S. President James K. Polk, including the annexation of Texas.

Death and legacy
Maull died at Lewes and is buried there at the St. Peter's Episcopal Churchyard.

The Maull House was added to the National Register of Historic Places in 1970, with a boundary increase in 1978.

Almanac
Elections were held the first Tuesday in October and members of the Delaware General Assembly took office on the first Tuesday of January. State senators had a three-year term. Since 1831, elections have been held on the first Tuesday after November 1 and state senators have had a four-year term. The governor takes office the third Tuesday in January, and has a four-year term.

References

Images
Hall of Governors Portrait Gallery. Portrait courtesy of Historical and Cultural Affairs, Dover

External links
Biographical Directory of the Governors of the United States
Delaware’s Governors

The Political Graveyard

Places with more information
Delaware Historical Society; website; 505 North Market Street, Wilmington, Delaware 19801; (302) 655-7161
University of Delaware; Library website; 181 South College Avenue, Newark, Delaware 19717; (302) 831-2965

1781 births
1846 deaths
People from Lewes, Delaware
Physicians from Delaware
Delaware Federalists
Delaware Whigs
Delaware state senators
Governors of Delaware
Burials in Sussex County, Delaware
Whig Party state governors of the United States
19th-century American politicians
19th-century American Episcopalians